Parisian Love is a black and white 1925 American silent romantic crime drama film directed by Louis J. Gasnier and starring Clara Bow. The film was produced by B.P. Schulberg Productions. A copy of this film still survives.

Plot
Street gangsters Armand and Marie are madly in love, and she persuades Armand and other gang members to rob the home of Pierre Marcel, a wealthy scientist. The police break up the robbery but Pierre hides Armand from them because he kept a gang member from stabbing him, but Armand is wounded in doing so. As Armand regains his health, Pierre sets him up with the beautiful Jean D'Arcy, and Armand has no objections. Marie – jealous of Jean – swears revenge on Pierre. They meet and he falls in love with her, and they are married while Armand is away in London. On their wedding night, Marie tells Pierre she is an Apache and her revenge is complete, and she rushes into Armand's arms. But her fellow gang members, who helped her deceive Pierre, shoot her.  As she recovers Pierre leaves for America and gets a divorce so she can be with Armand.

Cast

References

External links

Lobby card at www.gettyimages.com
Stills at moviessilently.com

1925 films
American black-and-white films
1920s English-language films
1925 crime drama films
1925 romantic drama films
American crime drama films
American romantic drama films
Films produced by B. P. Schulberg
American silent feature films
Preferred Pictures films
Romantic crime films
Silent romantic drama films
Films directed by Louis J. Gasnier
1920s American films
Silent American drama films